David Lim Kim San (born 7 May 1933) is considered to be one of the architects of music education in Singapore.

David Lim was born in a Peranakan and Methodist family. He attended Telok Kurau Primary School and Victoria School, where he was mentored by Benjamin Khoo and Paul Abisheganaden.

At the Ministry of Education (MOE), Khoo and David Lim started the Combined Schools Choir, which was later renamed the Singapore Youth Choir (SYC), in 1964. Lim took control of the SYC in 1968. They also initiated the school band movement and designed the band curriculum for MOE.

In 1969, Lim was promoted to head the Music Department in MOE. The number of school bands grew from 4 to 150 within a short period. He pioneered the instrumental teaching programme in primary schools which encouraged the use of instruments in the teaching and learning of music.

Lim was responsible for the formation and training of many junior college choirs. Many are led by former members of the SYC.

David Lim was the first recipient of the Cultural Medallion (Music) in 1979 for his contributions to music to Singapore.
 
He retired from MOE in 1996.

References
 David Lim Kim San

Recipients of the Cultural Medallion
Singaporean Methodists
Peranakan people in Singapore
Victoria School, Singapore alumni
1933 births
Singaporean educators
Singaporean conductors (music)
Living people
20th-century Singaporean educators
20th-century Singaporean musicians
20th-century conductors (music)
21st-century conductors (music)